Bagbele is a village in the Haut-Uele province of the Democratic Republic of the Congo, on the border with South Sudan.

References

Democratic Republic of the Congo–South Sudan border crossings
Populated places in Haut-Uélé